The Davidson Case is a 1929 detective novel  by John Rhode, the pen name of the British writer Cecil Street. It was the seventh appearance of the armchair detective Lancelot Priestley, who featured in a long-running series of novels during the Golden Age of Detective Fiction.

References

Bibliography
 Evans, Curtis. Masters of the "Humdrum" Mystery: Cecil John Charles Street, Freeman Wills Crofts, Alfred Walter Stewart and the British Detective Novel, 1920-1961. McFarland, 2014.
 Herbert, Rosemary. Whodunit?: A Who's Who in Crime & Mystery Writing. Oxford University Press, 2003.
 Reilly, John M. Twentieth Century Crime & Mystery Writers. Springer, 2015.

1929 British novels
Novels by Cecil Street
British crime novels
British mystery novels
British thriller novels
British detective novels
Geoffrey Bles books
Novels set in England